Scatochresis episema is a moth of the family Oecophoridae. It is known from New South Wales, Queensland, South Australia, Tasmania and Victoria.

Adults have grey or brown forewings with black marks all over them.

The larvae feed on the mammal scat of Phascolarctos cinereus.

References

Oecophorinae